Cabin in the Sky is a 1962 album featuring songs from the musical Cabin in the Sky by jazz trombonist Curtis Fuller accompanied by an orchestra arranged and conducted by Manny Albam which was released on the Impulse! label.

Reception

The Allmusic website awarded the album 3 stars, as did an October 25, 1962 review by Down Beat magazine.

Track listing
All compositions by Vernon Duke and John La Touche except where noted
 "The Prayer / Taking a Chance on Love" (George Bassman, Roger Edens / Duke, La Touche, Ted Fetter) - 4:42   
 "Cabin in the Sky" - 3:53   
 "The Old Ship of Zion" (Traditional) - 3:15   
 "Do What You Wanna Do" - 4:05   
 "Honey in the Honeycomb" - 3:17   
 "Happiness is a Thing Called Joe" (Harold Arlen, Yip Harburg) - 5:45   
 "Savannah" - 2:39   
 "Love Turned the Light Out" - 3:39   
 "In My Old Virginia Home (On the River Nile)" - 3:32   
 "Love Me Tomorrow (But Leave Me Alone Today) / The Prayer" (Duke, La Touche / Bassman, Edens) - 5:18

Personnel
Curtis Fuller - trombone
Al DeRisi, Bernie Glow, Freddie Hubbard, Ernie Royal - trumpet
Ray Alonge, Jim Buffington, Anthony Miranda, Morris Secon - French horn
Wayne Andre, Kai Winding - trombone
Bob Brookmeyer - valve trombone
Alan Raph - trombone, bass trombone
Harvey Phillips - tuba
Eddie Costa - vibraphone, percussion
Barry Galbraith - guitar
Hank Jones - piano
Art Davis, Milt Hinton - bass
Osie Johnson - drums
Harry Lookofsky - violin, concertmaster
Margaret Ross - harp
Unnamed string section
Manny Albam - arranger, conductor

References 

Curtis Fuller albums
Impulse! Records albums
1962 albums
Manny Albam albums
Albums arranged by Manny Albam
Albums conducted by Manny Albam
Albums produced by Bob Thiele
Albums recorded at Van Gelder Studio